In physics and chemistry, an ion is an atom or group of atoms with a net electric charge.

Ion or ION may also refer to:

Places
 Ion (Greece), a town of ancient Laconia, Greece
 Ion, a hamlet near to Lower Gravenhurst, Bedfordshire, England
 Ion, Iowa, an unincorporated community in the United States
 I'On, Mount Pleasant, South Carolina, a neighborhood
 Ion River, Romania

People
 Ion (name), both a given name and a surname

Ancient Greece
 Ion (dialogue), a dialogue by Plato, between Socrates and Ion, a reciter of epic poems
 Ion (mythology),  the son of Xuthus and Creüsa, daughter of Erechtheus
 Ion (play), a play by Euripides on the relationship between humans and the gods, in which Ion is instead the son of Apollo

Arts and entertainment
 I.O.N. (manga), a Japanese science fiction manga by Arina Tanemura
 Ion (DC Comics), a fictional character in the DC Comics universe
 Ion (Marvel Comics), a super villain in the Marvel Comics universe
 Fon Master Ion, from the video game Tales of the Abyss
 Ion Television, an American television network
 Ion (SCP Foundation), a fictional religious figure in the SCP Foundation universe

Computing and technology
 Ion (window manager), in computing a window manager for the X Window System
 Nvidia Ion, an Nvidia platform for the Intel Atom CPU
 Ion, a defunct communication network formerly advertised by Sprint Nextel
 ION (satellite) (Illinois Observing Nanosatellite), a satellite from the University of Illinois
 Alesis Ion, an analog-modeling synthesizer keyboard made by Alesis
 ION Audio, a brand of audio equipment manufacturer Numark Industries
 Ion (serialization format), a data serialization language developed by Amazon
 Index to Organism Names (ION), a database of published names in zoology, indexing the content of The Zoological Record
 Ion, a command line shell for Redox operating system
 Microsoft ION, a decentralized identity network that runs atop the Bitcoin blockchain

Transport
 Mitsubishi i-MiEV, sold in Europe as the Peugeot iOn
 Saturn Ion, an automobile formerly sold by General Motors
 Ion rapid transit, a light rail system currently operating in Waterloo Region, Ontario, Canada
 ION, IATA code for Impfondo Airport, Republic of the Congo
 U.S. Route 95 in Oregon, designated I.O.N. Highway No. 456

Other uses
 Ion (chocolate), a Greek chocolate brand
 Ion (paintball marker), made by Smart Parts
 Institute of Navigation
 Instituto Oncologico Nacional, Panama City

See also
 Aion (disambiguation)
 Ionic (disambiguation)